The action of 13 November 1943 was a submarine engagement of World War II. It resulted in the sinking of the Japanese Navy's Kaidai Junsen Type B1 submarine I-34 in the Strait of Malacca by the British Royal Navy submarine HMS Taurus. I-34 was on a Yanagi Mission, an underwater convoy secretly shipping goods between Japan and their German allies.

Background
The Japanese submarine I-34 under commander Irie Tatsushi, departed Kure on the first leg of a "Yanagi" mission to Nazi-occupied France. At the time she was the third Japanese submarine to undertake such a mission. Code-breakers at Hut 7 in Bletchley Park, however, intercepted and deciphered radio traffic transmitted in diplomatic code concerning I-34's mission between Tokyo and Berlin. The message was then relayed to the submarine operating in the area: HMS Taurus under the command of Lieutenant Commander Mervyn Wingfield operating from a base in Ceylon.

On the morning of 11 November I-34 departed Seletar for Penang. Before the submarine would have entered the South Atlantic, the Germans had planned to refuel I-34 in the Indian Ocean from a supply ship. When she departed I-34 was carrying a cargo of tin, tungsten, raw rubber and opium.

Action
Wingfield fired a spread of six torpedoes, one of which hit I-34's starboard side just below her conning tower; she sank rapidly, along with 84 of her crew. Only fourteen survivors managed to escape the wreck and were rescued by a Malay junk.

The following morning, a Japanese subchaser CH-20 from Penang attacked Taurus. Due to the shallow water in the region, when Wingfield tried to evade the attack by diving, Taurus''' bow became stuck in the soft, muddy seabed. Fortunately, the explosions from a pattern of depth charges dropped over Taurus shook her free. Wingfield went to periscope depth, surfaced and engaged CH-20 with his deck gun, severely damaging the subchaser. Thirteen were killed, including the captain, and another seventeen wounded, but before any further action could follow, a Japanese aircraft came into view and forced Wingfield into an emergency dive, which endangered the sub (it had taken on almost a ton of water.) Taurus, however, escaped with only minor damage and managed to make it back to her base at Ceylon.

Following the loss of I-34 the Imperial Japanese Navy diverted all Europe-bound submarines away from Penang. I-34'' was the first Japanese submarine to be sunk by a Royal Navy submarine.

Notes

Conflicts in 1943
1943 in British Malaya
World War II operations and battles of the Southeast Asia Theatre
A
Naval battles of World War II involving Japan
Submarine warfare in World War II
Military history of Ceylon in World War II
November 1943 events
Japan–United Kingdom military relations